Haydar Yılmaz (born 19 January 1984) is a Turkish professional footballer who plays as a goalkeeper for Vanspor.

References

1984 births
People from Susurluk
Living people
Turkish footballers
Association football goalkeepers
İnegölspor footballers
Gaziosmanpaşaspor footballers
Tarsus Idman Yurdu footballers
Şanlıurfaspor footballers
Kartalspor footballers
Alanyaspor footballers
Gaziantep F.K. footballers
Tuzlaspor players
Pendikspor footballers
Süper Lig players
TFF First League players
TFF Second League players